Külköy, also known as Kül, is a town in the Karahallı district of the Uşak province in Turkey, in the Aegean Region.  It is about 4 km away from the town of Karahallı.  The village has a primary school. There is drinking water and a sewerage network.

The remains of a Byzantine church has recently been detected in Külköy.

References

External links 
 

Populated places in Uşak Province
Towns in Turkey
Karahallı District